Old Tip Town is an unincorporated community in Tippecanoe Township, Marshall County, Indiana.

History
Old Tip Town was originally called Tippecanoe Town, and under the later name was platted in 1850.

Geography
Old Tip Town is located on the Tippecanoe River. Potawatomi Wildlife Park is located approximately one mile northeast of town and is home to many species of wildlife, including geese, ducks, frogs, turtles, rabbits, gray squirrels and deer.

Old cemetery on south side of town.

Gallery

References

Unincorporated communities in Marshall County, Indiana
Unincorporated communities in Indiana